Warren Berger (born October 20, 1958) is an American journalist. He has written five books (two as co-author) and numerous articles, primarily on innovation, creativity, design, mass media, and popular culture.

Early life and education
Warren Berger grew up in Whitestone, New York as the youngest of seven children. He graduated from Syracuse University's S. I. Newhouse School of Public Communications in 1980.

Career
After working as a newspaper journalist in Dallas, Texas, Berger moved back to New York and worked for several years as a magazine editor for CBS.

In 1990, Berger began writing independently and went on to publish a number of pieces in The New York Times and other publications. He wrote a business column for the Sunday Times and regularly contributed culture articles to the Arts & Leisure section and The New York Times Magazine. GQ, The Los Angeles Times Magazine, New York magazine, Reader’s Digest, and Business 2.0 all featured Berger's writing, and he served as a contributing editor at Wired magazine from 1999 to 2001.

Berger pursued his interest in advertising by writing articles for Ad Age’s Creativity, Communication Arts, Graphics, and Metropolis. In the mid-1990s, he formed an association with The One Club for Art & Copy, helping them launch the bimonthly publication ONE, about creativity in advertising, and then in 2007 launching the quarterly One: Design. In 2001, he wrote his first book Advertising Today, published by Phaidon Press. The book was included on Barnes & Noble’s best books of the year list, and was later included in a list of the “50 all time best books about media” compiled by The Independent of London.

He is the host of the website "AMoreBeautifulQuestion.com." Questioning is the topic of his two most recent books, The Book of Beautiful Questions (2018) and A More Beautiful Question (2014), both published by Bloomsbury.

Bibliography

Nonfiction
The Book of Beautiful Questions: The Powerful Questions That Will Help You Decide, Create, Connect, and Lead (2018; Bloomsbury Publishing)
A More Beautiful Question: The Power of Inquiry to Spark Breakthrough Ideas (2014; Bloomsbury Publishing)

CAD Monkeys, Dinosaur Babies, and T-Shaped People: Inside the World of Design Thinking and How It Can Spark Creativity and Innovation (2010; Penguin) U.S. paperback edition of Glimmer
Glimmer: How Design Can Transform Your Life and Maybe Even the World. Featuring the ideas and wisdom of design visionary Bruce Mau. (2009; The Penguin Press)
Nextville: Amazing Places to Live the Rest of Your Life (2008; Springboard Press); co-author with Barbara Corcoran
Hoopla: Crispin Porter + Bogusky (2007; PowerHouse Books)
No Opportunity Wasted: 8 Ways to Create a List for the Life You Want (2004; Rodale); co-author with Phil Keoghan of The Amazing Race
Advertising Today (2001; Phaidon Press)

Fiction
The Purples (2010; Ringer Books)

Anthology

 The Best Business Stories of the Year (2001; Pantheon)

Notes

External links
A More Beautiful Question website
Warren Berger author website

Living people
1958 births
American male writers
S.I. Newhouse School of Public Communications alumni
People from Whitestone, Queens